Skinny Grin is a 2006 album by Acoustic Ladyland, featuring the singles "Salt Water" and "Cuts & Lies". It was recorded at Eastcote Studios in London, engineered by Philip Bagenal and Al O'Connell. James Chance's guest appearance was recorded at The Cutting Room in New York City.

Track listing 
All songs arranged by Acoustic Ladyland except "Skinny Grin" by Acoustic Ladyland and Robert Harder.

 "Road of Bones" (P. Wareham) - 3:06
 "New Me" (P. Wareham, S. Rochford) - 2:22
 "Red Sky" (P. Wareham) - 5:03
 "Paris" (P. Wareham, M. Wareham, S. Rochford) - 2:49
 "Your Shame" (P. Wareham, M. Wareham, S. Rochford) - 3:03
 "Skinny Grin" (P. Wareham, M. Wareham) - 1:27
 "Salt Water (Scott Walker mix)" (P. Wareham, S. Rochford) - 3:48
 "Cuts & Lies" feat. Coco Electrik (P. Wareham, M. Wareham) - 3:15
 "Glass Agenda" (P. Wareham, M. Wareham, S. Rochford) - 2:39
 "That Night" (P. Wareham, M. Wareham) - 4:30
 "The Rise" (P. Wareham, M. Wareham) - 3:20
 "The Room" (P. Wareham) - 5:39
 "Hitting Home" (P. Wareham, M. Wareham) - 6:03

Personnel
Peter Wareham - tenor and baritone saxophones, vocals
Tom Cawley - keyboards, piano
Tom Herbert - bass guitar
Sebastian Rochford - drums

Additional personnel
James Chance - alto saxophone (track 7)
Coco Electrik - vocals (track 8)
Alice Grant - vocals (track 4)

References

2006 albums
V2 Records albums
Acoustic Ladyland albums